Paul Walford Erickson (December 14, 1915 – April 5, 2002), nicknamed "L'il Abner", was an American professional baseball right-handed pitcher whose career extended from 1937–49. He appeared in 207 games pitched in Major League Baseball (MLB) for the Chicago Cubs, Philadelphia Phillies, and New York Giants, between 1941 and 1948.

Erickson, a native of Zion, Illinois, was a contributor to the Cubs'  National League (NL) championship. He appeared in 28 games, nine as a starter, and won seven of 11 decisions with an earned run average (ERA) of 3.32, three complete games, and three saves, in 108 innings pitched. Erickson saved the final two games of the regular season against the Pittsburgh Pirates at Forbes Field, then worked in four of the seven games of the 1945 World Series, all Cub defeats, including the decisive Game 7 against the Detroit Tigers.  He had no decisions in the Fall Classic, and in seven innings pitched Erickson surrendered three earned runs, on eight hits, and three bases on balls, for a 3.86 ERA. He recorded three strikeouts.

The following season, 1946, saw the return to action of many MLB players who had served in military service during World War II, but Erickson enjoyed his best year in the big leagues, winning a career-best nine games and posting a 2.43 ERA.

Altogether, as a Major Leaguer, Erickson worked in 814 innings, allowing 774 hits, 425 bases on balls, and tallied 432 strikeouts. He won 37 of 85 decisions (.435) and notched six career saves.

References

External links

Paul Erickson Photo

1915 births
2002 deaths
Baseball players from Illinois
Chicago Cubs players
Indianapolis Indians players
Major League Baseball pitchers
Milwaukee Brewers (minor league) players
Nashville Vols players
New York Giants (NL) players
People from Zion, Illinois
Philadelphia Phillies players
Ponca City Angels players
Tulsa Oilers (baseball) players
Burials in Wisconsin